The following is a list of dams in Gunma  Prefecture, Japan.

List

See also

Notes

References 

Gunma